The 2015 Waratah Cup was the 13th season of Football NSW's knockout competition, and which ran from 3 June to 5 July. The Preliminary rounds are now a part of the 2015 FFA Cup competition.
The 5 winners from the FFA Cup preliminary Seventh Round qualified both for the Waratah Cup and for the 2015 FFA Cup Round of 32.

The winners were Sydney United 58, their 5th title (including predecessor knockout cup competitions).

Preliminary rounds

New South Wales clubs, other than Northern NSW and A-League clubs, participated in the 2015 FFA Cup via the preliminary rounds. The competition was for all Senior Men's teams of the National Premier Leagues NSW, NPL Division 2, State League Division 1, State League Division 2, as well as Association teams which applied to participate.

A total of 104 clubs entered into the competition, and the five qualifiers for the final rounds were:

Playoff round 

Two of the qualifiers played off to reduce the remaining teams to 4 for the Semi-finals.

Semi-finals

A total of 4 teams took part in this stage of the competition.

Grand final
The 2015 Waratah Cup Grand Final was played on 5 July 2015 at Valentine Sports Park.

References

Waratah Cup
Waratah Cup